Fernando de Carvajal y Ribera, O. de M. (also Fernando de Carvajal y Rivera) (1632 – 24 April 1701) was a Roman Catholic prelate who served as the Archbishop of Santo Domingo (1687–1700).

Biography
Fernando de Carvajal y Ribera was born in Salamanca, Spain and was ordained a friar in the Order of the Blessed Virgin Mary of Mercy. On 3 March 1687, he was selected by the King of Spain and confirmed by Pope Innocent XI as Archbishop of Santo Domingo. On 18 May 1687, he was consecrated bishop by Marcello Durazzo, Titular Archbishop of Chalcedon. He served as Archbishop of Santo Domingo until his resignation in December 1700. He died on 24 April 1701. While bishop, he was the principal consecrator of José González Blázquez, Bishop of Ciudad Rodrigo (1688), and the principal co-consecrator of Gregorio Solórzano Castillo, Bishop of Ávila (1700).

Fernando de Carvajal y Ribera nació en Salamanca, España y ordenó un fraile en la Orden de la Santísima Virgen María de la Misericordia. El 3 de marzo de 1687, fue seleccionado por el Rey de España y confirmado por el Papa Inocencio XI como Arzobispo de Santo Domingo. El 18 de mayo de 1687, fue consagrado obispo por Marcello Durazzo, arzobispo titular de Calcedonia. Se desempeñó como arzobispo de Santo Domingo hasta su renuncia en diciembre de 1700. Murió el 24 de abril de 1701. Aunque fue obispo, fue el consagrador principal de José González Blázquez, obispo de Ciudad Rodrigo (1688) y el co-consecrador principal de Gregorio. Solórzano Castillo, obispo de Ávila (1700).

References

External links and additional sources
 (for Chronology of Bishops) 
 (for Chronology of Bishops) 

1632 births
1701 deaths
Bishops appointed by Pope Innocent XI
Mercedarian bishops
Roman Catholic archbishops of Santo Domingo
People from Salamanca
17th-century Roman Catholic archbishops in the Dominican Republic